In civil engineering (more specifically highway engineering), grade separation is a method of aligning a junction of two or more surface transport axes at different heights (grades) so that they will not disrupt the traffic flow on other transit routes when they cross each other. The composition of such transport axes does not have to be uniform; it can consist of a mixture of roads, footpaths, railways, canals, or airport runways. Bridges (or overpasses, also called flyovers), tunnels (or underpasses), or a combination of both can be built at a junction to achieve the needed grade separation.

In North America, a grade-separated junction may be referred to as a grade separation or as an interchange – in contrast with an intersection, at-grade, a diamond crossing or a level crossing, which are not grade-separated.

Effects

Advantages
Roads with grade separation generally allow traffic to move freely, with fewer interruptions, and at higher overall speeds; this is why speed limits are typically higher for grade-separated roads. In addition, reducing the complexity of traffic movements reduces the risk of accidents.

Disadvantages 
Grade-separated road junctions are typically space-intensive, complicated, and costly, due to the need for large physical structures such as tunnels, ramps, and bridges. Their height can be obtrusive, and this, combined with the large traffic volumes that grade-separated roads attract, tend to make them unpopular to nearby landowners and residents. For these reasons, proposals for new grade-separated roads can receive significant public opposition.

Rail-over-rail grade separations take up less space than road grade separations: because shoulders are not needed, there are generally fewer branches and side road connections to accommodate (because a partial grade separation will accomplish more improvement than for a road), and because at-grade railway connections often take up significant space on their own. However, they require significant engineering effort, and are very expensive and time-consuming to construct.

Grade-separated pedestrian and cycling routes often require modest space since they do not typically intersect with the facility (such as a highway) that they cross. However, grade-separated pedestrian crossings with steps introduce accessibility problems. Some crossings have lifts, but these can be time-consuming to use.

Grade-separated roads that permit for higher speed limits can actually reduce safety due to 'weaving' (see below) as well as a perceived sense of safety.

Roads

Overview 
The term is most widely applied to describe a road junction in which the direct flow of traffic on one or more of the roads is not disrupted. Instead of a direct connection, traffic must use on and off ramps (United States, Australia, New Zealand) or slip roads (United Kingdom, Ireland) to access the other roads at the junction. The road which carries on through the junction can also be referred to as grade separated.

Typically, large freeways, highways, motorways, or dual carriageways are chosen to be grade separated, through their entire length or for part of it. Grade separation drastically increases the capacity of a road compared to an identical road with at-grade junctions. For instance, it is extremely uncommon to find an at-grade junction on a British motorway; it is all but impossible on a U.S. Interstate Highway, though a few do exist.

If traffic can traverse the junction from any direction without being forced to come to a halt, then the junction is described as fully grade separated or free-flowing.

Types

Fully separated 
These junctions connect two freeways:

Stack interchange (two-level, three-level, or four-level stack, depending on how many levels cross at the central point)
Cloverleaf interchange
Trumpet interchange
Cloverstack interchange
Directional T
Semi-directional T
Turbine (whirlpool) interchange
Windmill interchange
Various incarnations of spaghetti junction

Partially separated 
These junctions connect two roads, but only one is fully grade-separated, i.e. traffic on one road does not have to stop at yield lines or signals on one road, but may have to do so when switching to the other:

Diamond interchange
Partial cloverleaf interchange
Single-point urban interchange
Roundabout interchange
Compact grade-separation, whereby the two roads are linked by a compact "connector road", with major-minor priority junctions at each of its ends; usually a variant of the cloverleaf type interchange, but only involving two quadrants rather than four

Weaving

On roadways with grade-separated interchanges, weaving is a result of placing an exit ramp a short distance after an entry ramp, causing conflicts between traffic attempting to leave the roadway at the next junction and traffic attempting to enter from the previous junction.  This situation is most prevalent either where the junction designer has placed the on-slip to the road before the off-slip at a junction (for example, the cloverleaf interchange), or in urban areas with many close-spaced junctions. The ring road of Coventry, England, is a notorious example, as are parts of the southern M25, the London orbital motorway, the M6/M5 junction north-west of Birmingham, and the A4/M5 junction west of Bristol. Weaving can often cause side-on collisions on very fast roads with top speeds of up to 200 kilometres per hour, as well as the problem of blind spots.

Where junctions have unusual designs weaving can be a problem other than on the main road. An example of this can be found at Junction 7 of the M6, where traffic joining the roundabout from the M6 Eastbound off-slip must weave with the traffic already on the roundabout wishing to use the M6 Westbound on-slip. This is as a result of the slip roads on the west side of the junction connecting to the roundabout on the inside of the eastern arc rather than the outside of the western arc as is normal. The two slip-roads are connected by a single lane on the inside of the roundabout, which traffic wishing to use the Westbound on-slip must join, and traffic from the Eastbound off-slip must leave.

Weaving can be alleviated by using collector/distributor roads or braided ramps to separate entering and exiting traffic.

Railways

In general 
In railway construction, grade separation also means the avoidance of level crossings by making any roads crossing the line either pass under or over the railway on bridges. This greatly improves safety and is crucial to the safe operation of high-speed lines.  The London Extension of the Great Central Railway, built between 1896 and 1899, was the first fully grade-separated railway of this type in the UK. This also applies to light rail and even to street cars.

Flying junction 

Attempts have been made to increase the capacity of railways by making tracks cross in a grade-separated manner, as opposed to the traditional use of flat crossings to change tracks. A grade-separated rail interchange is known as a flying junction and one which is not a level junction.

In 1897, the London and South Western Railway (LSWR) made use of a flying junction at Worting Junction south of Basingstoke to allow traffic on the Salisbury and Southampton routes to converge without conflicting movements; this became known as "Battledown Flyover". Also in Britain, the Southern Railway later made extensive use of flying junctions on other parts of its busy former LSWR main line.

Today in Britain, the tightly grouped nest of flying junctions to the north of Clapham Junction railway station—although technically a combination of many junctions—handle more than 4,000 trains per day (about one train every 15 seconds).

Virtually all major railway lines no longer cross (forming an 'X' shape) at flat level (although many diverge - i.e. 'Y' shape).

High-speed railways (+) 
On almost all high-speed railway lines, the faster speed requires grade separation. Therefore, many high speed lines are elevated, especially in Taiwan and Japan, where population density alongside high speed lines is higher than in France, Italy or Germany.

In the United States, a flying junction on the Nickel Plate Road through Cleveland, Ohio, United States was completed in 1913. The most frequent use was later found on the former Pennsylvania Railroad main lines. The lines are included as part of the Northeast Corridor and Keystone Corridor now owned by Amtrak. The most complex of these junctions, near Philadelphia Zoo, handles railway traffic for Amtrak, SEPTA, New Jersey Transit, Norfolk Southern, CSX Transportation, and Conrail.

In what is known as "area 1520", which includes the former Soviet Union and other regions using the same gauge, the most complicated grade-separation railpoint is found at Liubotyn in Ukraine.

Footbridges and subways
Footbridges and pedestrian/cyclist subways (called underpasses in North America as well as in the United Kingdom when referring to roads) are often employed to allow pedestrians and cyclists to cross busy streets and highways. Though introduced to Central Park in New York City in the 1860s, subways are far more common today in Europe, especially in countries such as the Netherlands, and Denmark where cycling is strongly encouraged. Long underpasses may be called tunnels.

References

Junction types